is a Japanese footballer who plays as a forward for J1 League club Shonan Bellmare, on loan from FC Tokyo.

Career
After attending Fukuoka University, Yamashita joined Renofa Yamaguchi FC for 2018 season.

Club statistics

References

External links

Profile at J. League
Profile at Renofa Yamaguchi

1996 births
Living people
Association football people from Fukuoka Prefecture
Fukuoka University alumni
Japanese footballers
J1 League players
J2 League players
Renofa Yamaguchi FC players
JEF United Chiba players
FC Tokyo players
Shonan Bellmare players
Association football forwards